John F. and Malissa Koontz House, also known as the Koontz House and Koontz-Engle House, is a historic home located at Indian Creek Township, Monroe County, Indiana.  It was built in 1872, and is a two-story, Greek Revival style brick two-thirds I-house.  It rests on a hammered limestone foundation and has a side-gable roof.  Also on the property is the contributing brick walkway.

It was listed on the National Register of Historic Places in 2014.

References

Houses on the National Register of Historic Places in Indiana
Greek Revival houses in Indiana
Houses completed in 1872
Buildings and structures in Monroe County, Indiana
National Register of Historic Places in Monroe County, Indiana